Wales is a village in Waukesha County, Wisconsin, first settled by Welsh immigrants. The population was 2,862 at the time of the 2020 census.

Geography
Wales is located at  (43.003882, -88.377558).

Demographics

2010 census
As of the census of 2010, there were 2,549 people, 949 households, and 792 families living in the village. The racial makeup of the village was 97.9% White, 0.4% African American, 0.2% Native American, 0.5% Asian, 0.1% Pacific Islander, 0.2% from other races, and 0.7% from two or more races. Hispanic or Latino of any race were 1.8% of the population.

There were 949 households, of which 37.7% had children under the age of 18 living with them, 68.5% were married couples living together, 10.3% had a female householder with no husband present, 4.6% had a male householder with no wife present, and 16.5% were non-families. 12.5% of all households were made up of individuals, and 3.5% had someone living alone who was 65 years of age or older. The average household size was 2.69 and the average family size was 2.93.

The median age in the village was 43.1 years. 25.8% of residents were under the age of 18; 6.1% were between the ages of 18 and 24; 21.7% were from 25 to 44; 36.7% were from 45 to 64; and 9.8% were 65 years of age or older. The gender makeup of the village was 50.3% male and 49.7% female.

2000 census
As of the census of 2000, there were 2,523 people, 846 households, and 731 families living in the village. The population density was 1,033.4 people per square mile (399.2/km2). There were 863 housing units at an average density of 353.5 per square mile (136.6/km2). The racial makeup of the village was 98.61% White, 0.16% African American, 0.24% Native American, 0.24% Asian, 0.20% from other races, and 0.55% from two or more races. Hispanic or Latino of any race were 1.03% of the population.

There were 846 households, out of which 46.2% had children under the age of 18 living with them, 76.7% were married couples living together, 7.0% had a female householder with no husband present, and 13.5% were non-families. 10.2% of all households were made up of individuals, and 2.7% had someone living alone who was 65 years of age or older. The average household size was 2.98 and the average family size was 3.20.

In the village, the population was spread out, with 30.3% under the age of 18, 7.3% from 18 to 24, 29.0% from 25 to 44, 29.2% from 45 to 64, and 4.2% who were 65 years of age or older. The median age was 37 years. For every 100 females, there were 103.5 males. For every 100 females age 18 and over, there were 101.4 males.

The median income for a household in the village was $75,000, and the median income for a family was $77,468. Males had a median income of $50,609 versus $35,268 for females. The per capita income for the village was $26,712. None of the families and 0.2% of the population were living below the poverty line, including no under eighteens and none of those over 64.

Education
 School District of Kettle Moraine
 Kettle Moraine High School, a recognized Blue Ribbon School
 Wales Elementary School

Recreation
 Glacial Drumlin Trail
 Wales Community Park
 Wales Firemans' Park
Breconshire park

Places of worship
 Jerusalem Presbyterian Church
 All Saints Lutheran Church, ELCA
 Bethlehem Lutheran Church, Missouri Synod

Public safety
All fire rescue and EMS services are provided by the Wales/Genesee Fire Department. Law enforcement in Wales is provided by the Waukesha County Sheriff.

History
Welsh immigrants settled the village of Wales in 1840. The remains of Welsh history can be seen in the village's flag that replicates the Welsh national flag.

References

External links
 Village of Wales, Wisconsin

Villages in Waukesha County, Wisconsin
Villages in Wisconsin